Korean Mongolian or Mongolian Korean may refer to:

Mongol invasions of Korea, 1231–1270, a series of campaigns by the Mongol Empire against the Kingdom of Goryeo
North Korea-Mongolia relations, the historic and current bilateral relations between Mongolia and North Korea
South Korea-Mongolia relations, foreign relations between South Korea and the Mongolia
Koreans in Mongolia, one of the Korean diaspora communities in Asia
Mongolians in South Korea, the world's largest population of Mongolian citizens abroad
Multiethnic people of mixed Korean and Mongolian descent